The IT cluster Rhine-Main-Neckar, also known as Silicon Valley of Germany, is one of the most important locations of the IT and high-tech industry worldwide. It is concentrated in the Rhine-Main and Rhine-Neckar metropolitan regions. The IT cluster Rhine-Main-Neckar is the largest IT cluster in Europe. 50 percent of the worldwide revenue of the hundred largest European software companies are generated by companies in this region. The Rhine-Main-Neckar region also has one of the most important biopharmaceutical, fintech, finance and consulting clusters in Europe.

In addition to universities such as Technische Universität Darmstadt and University of Frankfurt and research institutions such as the German Research Center for Artificial Intelligence and ATHENE, software companies such as SAP SE, Software AG and T-Systems also have their headquarters in the region.

Importance in the world 
In 2010, the French venture capital firm Truffle Capital published in its study "Truffle 100 European Clusters" that the Rhine-Main-Neckar region accounts for 50 percent of the worldwide revenue of the hundred largest European software providers. It compared the Rhine-Main-Neckar region as an IT cluster with Silicon Valley as the "Silicon Valley of Europe". According to this study, the Rhine-Main-Neckar IT cluster combined more than 12.5 billion euros in software-related sales in 2009. The next largest European IT cluster was Paris with 2.4 billion euros.

In a 2009 study, the region was compared with IT clusters such as Oulu (Finland), Bangalore (India) and Silicon Valley. In contrast to the Silicon Valley, the main business area of the companies in the region is enterprise software.

According to a study by the European Commission, Darmstadt has the best cluster among all EU regions in the emerging industries. Emerging industries means future technologies that the EU attaches particular importance to for growth in Europe. Darmstadt also has the best biopharmaceutical cluster in Europe. The Rhineland-Palatinate region, which partly belongs to the Rhine-Main-Neckar region, ranks second among the biopharmaceutical clusters.

The region is one of the most important locations for IT security research worldwide. Darmstadt has the renowned ATHENE, the national center for research in security and privacy in Germany and the largest research institute for IT security in Europe. According to an analysis by Startup Genome, a company specialising in the analysis of startup ecosystems, the Rhine-Main region is also home to one of the world's most important startup ecosystems in the field of IT security and fintech.

Importance in Germany 
The IT cluster Rhein-Main-Neckar is part of the Spitzencluster Software-Cluster, which also includes other regions. In January 2010, the Software-Cluster won the German government's Spitzencluster competition, the equivalence to the German Universities Excellence Initiative for clusters. The cluster's goal is to enable the transformation of companies into digital companies. This cluster consists of the centers Darmstadt, Kaiserslautern, Karlsruhe, Saarbrücken and Walldorf. Since 2017, the German Federal Ministry of Education and Research has supported the cooperation between the German Research Center for Artificial Intelligence and the Technische Universität Darmstadt with companies and research institutions from Silicon Valley, Singapore and Bahia, Brazil.

In a competition, the Federal Association for Information Technology, Telecommunications and New Media awarded Darmstadt the title of Digital City in 2017. This victory is intended to turn Darmstadt into a digital model city. In 2016, the Federal Ministry of Finance decided to make the region around Darmstadt the pre-eminent hub for the digital transformation of the economy.

According to a study by the auditing firm Ernst & Young from 2018, 24% of all Fintechs in Germany have settled in the Rhine-Main-Neckar region, with Frankfurt being considered the centre. This makes the Rhine-Main-Neckar region one of the most important locations for the fintech industry in Germany.

According to a study from 2013, the Rhine-Main region has the best cluster in Germany in the financial and consulting industry.

According to the German Research Foundation (DFG), the Technische Universität Darmstadt (TU Darmstadt) is one of the best universities in Germany in terms of research in computer science and the University of Mainz in the natural sciences. According to the report of the German Research Foundation (DFG) from 2018, in the period under review from 2014 to 2016 the TU Darmstadt received the highest number of competitive grants in the field of computer science and the University of Mainz the highest number of competitive grants in the natural sciences. In a competitive selection process, the DFG selects the best research projects from researchers at universities and research institutes and finances them. The ranking is thus regarded as an indicator of the quality of research. In a nationwide competition by the Federal Ministry of Economics and Energy, the Technische Universität Darmstadt was honoured as founding university.

Resident universities  

 Technische Universität Darmstadt
University of Frankfurt
University of Mannheim
University of Mainz
University of Applied Sciences Mainz
Darmstadt University of Applied Sciences
Frankfurt University of Applied Sciences
RheinMain University of Applied Sciences
Technische Universität Kaiserslautern
University of Applied Sciences Worms

The Karlsruhe Institute of Technology is not located directly in the IT-Cluster Rhine-Main-Neckar, but is adjacent to it and has nevertheless contributed to its development.

Resident companies (selection) 

SAP
Software AG
DE-CIX
Merck Group
Microsoft Germany
Oracle Germany
IBM Germany
Rakuten Kobo Inc. Germany
Nemetschek
Airbus
Opel
Accenture
Capgemini
 Computer Sciences Corporation
 Crytek
Fujitsu Semiconductor Europe
 Isra Vision
 Kalypso Media
 MAXON
 Schott AG
 Singulus Technologies
 T-Systems
 Terma A/S
 TrekStor
United Internet

Resident research institutes (selection) 

 German Research Centre for Artificial Intelligence
 GSI Helmholtz Centre for Heavy Ion Research
 European Space Operations Centre
 European Organisation for the Exploitation of Meteorological Satellites
ATHENE
 Center for IT Security, Privacy and Accountability

See also 
 Silicon Saxony
 German Silicon Valley (disambiguation)

References 

Information technology places
Rhine-Neckar
Industry in Germany
Economy of Hesse